Mirosław Car (24 November 1960 - 7 June 2013) was a Polish professional football player who played as a defender.

Biography 
Car started his football career in 1978 with Tur Bielsk Podlaski, remaining at the club for three seasons. Later he was transferred to Legia Warsaw, where he played two seasons, winning the Polish Cup with the club in 1981.  After leaving Legia, Car played for Motor Lublin for three seasons, before being sold to Jagiellonia Białystok, where he remained for three seasons, finishing second in the I Liga with the club. After he left Jagiellonia Bialystok, he returned to Tur Bielsk Podlaski, before retiring in 1990.

Death 

On 7 June 2013, Mirosław Car died at the age of 52.

References 

1960 births
2013 deaths
Polish footballers
People from Bielsk Podlaski
Sportspeople from Podlaskie Voivodeship

Association football defenders